Prothemenops siamensis is a species of armored trapdoor spider in the family Idiopidae. It is found in Thailand.

References

Idiopidae
Articles created by Qbugbot
Spiders described in 1991